Ilex perlata is a species of plant in the family Aquifoliaceae. It is endemic to China.

References

perlata
Endemic flora of China
Flora of Yunnan
Critically endangered flora of Asia
Taxonomy articles created by Polbot